Newcastle railway station was on the Belfast and County Down Railway which ran from Belfast to Newcastle, County Down in Northern Ireland.

History

The station was opened by the Belfast and County Down Railway on 25 March 1869.

The station closed to passengers in 1955, by which time it had been taken over by the Ulster Transport Authority.  It is now a Lidl supermarket.

References 

 
 
 

Disused railway stations in County Down
Railway stations opened in 1869
Railway stations closed in 1955
1869 establishments in Ireland
1955 disestablishments in Northern Ireland
railway station
Railway stations in Northern Ireland opened in the 19th century